Robert Duggan may refer to:
 Robert Duggan (attorney)
 Robert Duggan (venture capitalist)

See also
 Robert Dugan, Australian cricketer